Kamijo or Kamijō may refer to:

 Kamijo (musician) - a Japanese musician
 Akimine Kamijo - a Japanese manga artist
 Atsushi Kamijo - a Japanese manga artist
 Kamijō Station (Nagano) - train station in Nagano
 Kamijō Station (Niigata) - train station in Niigata
 Hikari Kamijo - a fictional character in the anime/manga Hikari no Densetsu
 Tōma Kamijō - a fictional character in the anime/manga Toaru Majutsu no Index
 Mutsuki Kamijō - a fictional character in the tokusatsu TV show Kamen Rider Blade

See also
 Kamijō Station (disambiguation)

Japanese-language surnames